Gemma Collis-McCann (born 10 October 1992) is a British Paralympic wheelchair fencer who competed in the Paralympics in 2012 and 2016. She is vice-chair of the International Wheelchair and Amputee Sports Federation's Wheelchair Fencing Athletes' Council. She is in the GB fencing team to compete in Tokyo in 2021.

Life

Gemma Collis grew up in Buckinghamshire as a competitive athlete in multiple sports: figure skating, hockey, 100 metres running, and triple jump, in the last of which she hoped to compete in the London 2012 Summer Olympics. But in July 2008, aged 15, she developed complex regional pain syndrome, causing altered sensation and extreme pain in her right leg, making her dependent on crutches or a wheelchair from then on. She changed from participating in sports events to coaching, officiating, and volunteering at them. In 2010, she discovered she qualified to play wheelchair basketball, and played for Wales u25s at the Lord's Taverners Wheelchair Basketball Celtic Cup 2011.

She was educated at the Durham University from 2011, where she was asked if she would be interested in fencing by professor and GB wheelchair fencing coach Laszlo Jakab in 2011. Jakab would become her friend and was a witness at her wedding. She competed in the Paralympics in London in 2012 after less than a year in the sport. In the team event she came sixth with teammates Gabi Down and Justine Moore.  She fenced again at the Paralympics in the 2016 Rio, where she was ranked eighth in the Women's Category A Épée. In 2017 she had her right leg amputated as a result of the pain from complex regional pain syndrome.

Gemma Collis married fellow British Paralympian Craig McCann in July 2017; both took the hyphenated last name Collis-McCann He had competed at the 2012 Paralympics in wheelchair fencing, then switched sports to para-cycling by 2017.

In 2018 Gemma Collis-McCann gained a gold medal at the World Championships in Montreal. She beat Zsuzsanna Krajnyak of Poland in the deciding match where she won 15–13.

She is vice-chair of the International Wheelchair and Amputee Sports Federation's Wheelchair Fencing Athletes' Council. In 2021 she joined other international representatives including Ksenia Ovsyannikova on a new Gender Equity Commission set up to look at Wheelchair Fencing. In July 2021 she and three sportsmen, Piers Gilliver, Dimitri Coutya and Oliver Lam-Watson were identified as the British wheelchair fencing team who would compete at the delayed 2020 Summer Paralympics in Tokyo. Her selection followed 18 months when she did not compete due to the COVID-19 pandemic, including the closing of the Tokyo qualification window by the International Wheelchair and Amputee Sports Federation. She has qualified for three Paralympics, but in Tokyo she qualified for both the Category A épée and the sabre. She competed in both and although see performed better than her ranking she said she was disappointed with the result but she had learned a lot. She was planning for 2024 in Paris. In 2022 she was invited to go to Auckland to help with training with Russian medallist Ksenia Ovsyannikova, French fencer Dominique Hornus-Dragne and Christina Massiala-Vaka at the World Conference on Women and Sport.

References

Living people
1992 births
British female fencers
Paralympic wheelchair fencers of Great Britain
Alumni of Durham University